Group 3 of the 1962 FIFA World Cup took place from 30 May to 7 June 1962. The group consisted of Brazil, Czechoslovakia, Mexico, and Spain.

Standings

Matches
All times listed are local time.

Brazil vs Mexico
Brazilians attacked and Mexicans defended for most of the match. In the first half Pelé hit the woodwork with a free kick outside the box. Ten minutes after the break he made a cross from the right on Zagallo who headed the first goal. Then, after 73 minutes, Pele dribbled past four defenders and scored with his left foot from inside the penalty area.

Czechoslovakia vs Spain
Spain took the initiative but only managed to create danger in disorganized attacks. Spanish players repelled the harshness of the Czechs with the same violence. That fact provoked the snub of spectators who soon leaned in favour of Czechoslovakia. The injuries of Rivilla and Reija, the two defensive sides, made things worse for Spain. The Czechs seemed to settle for the draw but in 10 minutes' time a mistake from the centre of the Spanish field allowed Josef Štibrányi to face Carmelo's goal and score. The Spanish team weighed down by the injuries managed to create very little danger in the last minutes of the match.

Brazil vs Czechoslovakia
Brazil had to play part of the game with ten players after Pelé tore a thigh muscle midway through the first half. Neither side could break the deadlock and the game ended in 0-0 draw. The two sides would meet again in the final.

Spain vs Mexico
The game had very little rhythm and Spanish attacks were lost or easily stopped by the Aztec defense or goalkeeper Carvajal. In the second half physical spending began to take its toll on Spain and Mexico took attack positions. However in one of counterattacks Luis Suárez and Puskas scored a goal which was cancelled for offside. In the last minutes of the game Mexicans claimed a penalty in the Spanish area. The game continued and the ball reached Gento who made a run on the left wing. Gento passed in to Peiró who finished past Carvajal a few seconds from the final whistle. Spain achieves victory, Santamaría, Pachín and Peiró were named the best men of the Spanish side according to the press.

Brazil vs Spain
Spain had control of the game in the first half and took the lead 10 minutes before halftime when Adelardo shot into the bottom corner from twenty meters. At the beginning of the second half Nílton Santos committed a foul inside the penalty area but the referee being far away from the episode awarded only a free kick to the Spanish team. Spain also had a goal disallowed for no evident reason. In the last 15 minutes of the game Amarildo (who was replacing Pele after the latter was injured in the previous match) scored twice to complete the Brazilian comeback.

Mexico vs Czechoslovakia
In this game Václav Mašek scored the fastest goal in the history of the tournament after only 15 seconds. Isidoro Díaz equalized after sweeping past two defenders, Alfredo del Águila made it 2-1 before half time. In the second half Mexicans secured their first World Cup victory with a late penalty converted by Héctor Hernández.

References

External links
 1962 FIFA World Cup archive

1962 FIFA World Cup
Brazil at the 1962 FIFA World Cup
Czechoslovakia at the 1962 FIFA World Cup
Spain at the 1962 FIFA World Cup
Mexico at the 1962 FIFA World Cup